Dry Fork is a  long 1st order tributary to White Oak Creek in Pittsylvania County, Virginia.

Course 
Dry Fork rises in a pond about 4 miles northeast of Pleasant Gap, Virginia and then flows generally north to join White Oak Creek about 0.5 miles north of Dry Fork.

Watershed 
Dry Fork drains  of area, receives about 45.8 in/year of precipitation, has a wetness index of 395.81, and is about 51% forested.

See also 
 List of Virginia Rivers

References 

Rivers of Virginia
Rivers of Pittsylvania County, Virginia
Tributaries of the Roanoke River